Héctor Ladero Rivas (born 13 May 1989 in Salamanca, Castile and León) is a Spanish retired footballer who played as a central defender, and is the assistant manager of Lenoir–Rhyne Bears.

References

External links

1989 births
Living people
Sportspeople from Salamanca
Spanish footballers
Footballers from Castile and León
Association football defenders
Segunda División B players
Tercera División players
CD Numancia B players
CD Numancia players
Real Unión footballers
Celta de Vigo B players
UD Salamanca players
Spanish expatriate footballers
Expatriate soccer players in the United States
Spanish expatriate sportspeople in the United States
21st-century Spanish people